Frank Everson Vandiver (December 9, 1925 in Austin, Texas – January 7, 2005 in College Station, Texas) was an American Civil War historian, and former president of Texas A&M University and the University of North Texas, as well as  acting president of Rice University.  Vandiver wrote, co-wrote, or edited 24 books, and published an additional 100 scholarly articles or reviews.  One of his books was a runner-up for a National Book Award.

Early years
Vandiver was born in Texas.  He joined the United States Army Air Corps during World War II and served as a historian.  Despite not having a high school diploma, following the war, Vandiver entered the University of Texas at Austin to study humanities and American studies.  He was awarded a Rockefeller Fellowship for his studies.  Vandiver received his Master of Arts degree from the University of Texas in 1949 and was awarded a PhD from Tulane University in 1951.

Teaching
After graduation, Vandiver accepted a teaching position as Washington University in St. Louis, but left within a few years to teach at Rice University in Houston, Texas, becoming a full professor in 1958.  Over the next two decades, Vandiver was promoted to department chair, master of Brown College, provost, and vice president, serving as the acting president in 1969-1970.  In 1963-1964 he served as Harold Vyvyan Harmsworth Professor of American History at Oxford University.  In 1969 during his tenure as acting president, Houston Independent School District awarded Vandiver his only missing degree - a high school diploma.  In 1979 Vandiver left Rice to become the president of what is now the University of North Texas.

Texas A&M University
In 1981 Vandiver became president of Texas A&M University.  During his tenure, Vandiver was a driving force behind the adoption of a law creating space-grant colleges in the United States.  Colleges given this designation would gain federal funds to research space-related technologies.  Vandiver believed that Texas A&M was well-positioned to become one of the first of these institutions and remarked that such a designation would "elevate Texas A&M from being an excellent institution for space-related studies to being a great one".

Vandiver resigned as president of A&M in 1988, citing a desire to spend more time on research and writing. Rather than leave the university, he established the Mosher Defense Studies Institute, a national defense think tank.  He was also named a distinguished professor in the history department.

Writing
Vandiver wrote, co-wrote or edited 24 books, most centered on the American Civil War.  Almost half of his books were still in print at the time of his death, including his first book Ploughshares Into Swords: Josiah Gorgas and Confederate Ordnance (1952).  His 1977 book Black Jack: The Life and Times of John J. Pershing, was a runner-up for a National Book Award.  He also published over 100 scholarly articles or reviews.

Vandiver was awarded many honors for his work.  Among these were honors from two Civil War Round Tables (Houston and Baton Rouge).  The Houston Civil War Round Table renamed their annual award of merit the Frank E. Vandiver Award in 1985.  Vandiver was also awarded a distinguished service award from the Houston chapter of the Texas Society, Sons of the American Revolution, and was named an honorary professor at the Universidad Nacional de Asuncion in Paraguay.

Personal life
The Houston Chronicle described Vandiver as "a colorful and articulate man with much personal charm".  He was married twice.  His first wife Carol Sue Smith died in 1979.  In 1981 Vandiver married Renee Aubry Carmody.  He had three children.

Vandiver died at his home in College Station, Texas on January 7, 2005.

Selected works
Ploughshares Into Swords: Josiah Gorgas and Confederate Ordnance (1952)
Rebel Brass: The Confederate Command System (1956)
Mighty Stonewall (1957)
Jubal's Raid: General Early's Famous Attack on Washington in 1864 (1960)
Their Tattered Flags: The Epic of the Confederacy (1970)
Black Jack: The Life and Times of John J. Pershing (1977) — runner up for  National Book Award
Blood Brothers: A Short History of the Civil War (1992)
Shadows of Vietnam: Lyndon Johnson's Wars (1997)
1001 Things Everyone Should Know About the Civil War (1999)
1001 Things Everyone Should Know About World War II (2000)

References

External links
Frank E. Vandiver, obituary from Texas A&M University

Guide to the Frank E. Vandiver papers, 1947-c. 1977 (Woodson Research Center, Fondren Library, Rice University, Houston, TX, USA)

1926 births
2005 deaths
20th-century American historians
American male non-fiction writers
Presidents of Texas A&M University
Rice University faculty
University of North Texas
University of Texas at Austin College of Liberal Arts alumni
Tulane University alumni
Harold Vyvyan Harmsworth Professors of American History
Historians from Texas
20th-century American male writers
20th-century American academics